History Lesson New Years 1997 is the seventh Archive release by Athens, Georgia's Widespread Panic.  The performance was recorded live at the Fox Theater in Atlanta, Georgia on December 31, 1997.  The multi-track recordings featured all original band members including late guitarist Michael Houser.

Track listing

Disc 1
 "Coconut" (Widespread Panic) - 7:16
 "Let's Get This Show On The Road" (Michael Stanley) - 6:01
 "Wish You Were Here (David Gilmour, Roger Waters)" - 4:45
 "Stop-Go" (Widespread Panic) - 6:39
 "Travelin' Light" (J.J. Cale) - 7:17
 "Ophelia" (Robbie Robertson) - 4:34
 "Junior" (Kimbrough, Spring) - 5:14

Personnel

Widespread Panic
 John "JB" Bell - Vocals, Guitar
 Michael Houser - Guitar, Vocals
 David Schools - Bass, Vocals
 John "JoJo" Hermann - Keyboards, Vocals
 Todd Nance - Drums
 Domingo "Sunny" Ortiz - Percussion

Staff
 Mixed and Mastered by Drew Vandenberg at Chase Park Transduction Studios in Athens, GA.
 Recorded by Danny Friedman
 Packaging by Chris Bilheimer
 Set List by Garrie Vereen
 Photos by Thomas G. Smith

References

External links
 Widespread Panic website
 

2011 live albums
Widespread Panic live albums